Sepiadarium nipponianum is a species of cuttlefish native to the western Pacific Ocean; it occurs off the Japanese islands of Shikoku, Kyūshū, and southern Honshū.

The type specimen was collected off Japan and is deposited at the National Museum of Natural History in Washington, D.C.

References

External links

Cuttlefish
Molluscs described in 1932
Taxa named by Samuel Stillman Berry